A paso de cojo is a 1980 Mexican film. It was directed by Luis Alcoriza. The film is set during the Cristero War and about a group of villagers getting involved in it.

External links
 

1980 films
Mexican crime comedy films
1980s Spanish-language films
Films set in Mexico
Films directed by Luis Alcoriza
Mexican war films
1980s Mexican films